The men's 200 metres event was part of the track and field athletics programme at the 1920 Summer Olympics. The competition was held on Thursday, August 19, 1920, and on Friday, August 20, 1920. Forty-eight sprinters from 22 nations competed. Nations were limited to 4 athletes each, down from the 12 allowed in previous Games. The event was won by Allen Woodring of the United States, the nation's second consecutive victory in the event and fourth in five Games. Fellow American Charley Paddock took silver. Great Britain reached the podium for a second consecutive Games with Harry Edward's bronze.

Background

This was the fifth appearance of the event, which was not held at the first Olympics in 1896 but has been on the program ever since. None of the finalists from the pre-war 1912 Games returned. The favorite was Charley Paddock, winner of the U.S. trials and the 1919 Inter-Allied Championships. The strongest non-American competitor was Harry Edward of Great Britain, the 1920 AAA champion.

Czechoslovakia, Denmark, Egypt, Estonia, Luxembourg, Monaco, New Zealand, Spain, and Switzerland each made their debut in the event. The United States made its fifth appearance, the only nation to have competed at each edition of the 200 metres to date.

Competition format

The competition expanded to four rounds: heats, quarterfinals, semifinals, and a final. There were 12 heats of between 3 and 5 runners each, with the top 2 men in each advancing to the quarterfinals. The quarterfinals consisted of 5 heats of between 4 and 5 athletes each; the two fastest men in each heat advanced to the semifinals. There were 2 semifinals, each with 5 runners. In that round, the top three athletes advanced. The final had 6 runners.

The race was run on a 390-metre track that was wet and soft.

Records

These were the standing world and Olympic records (in seconds) prior to the 1920 Summer Olympics.

* unofficial 220 yards (= 201.17 m)

** straight course

No new world or Olympic records were set during the competition.

Schedule

Results
Times were generally only published for the winners of each heat. Some of the times listed below are estimates based on contemporary reports of the races.

Round 1

Heat 1

Heat 2

Heat 3

Heat 4

Heat 5

Heat 6

Heat 7

Heat 8

Heat 9

Heat 10

Heat 11

Heat 12

Quarterfinals

Quarterfinal 1

Quarterfinal 2

Quarterfinal 3

Quarterfinal 4

Quarterfinal 5

Semifinals

Semifinal 1

Semifinal 2

Final

References

Further reading
 
 

200 metres
200 metres at the Olympics